Syncopacma steppicolella is a moth of the family Gelechiidae. It is found in Russia (the southern Ural). The habitat consists of dry steppe slopes with diversified flora.

The wingspan is 8.5–9.5 mm. The ground colour of the forewings is dark fuscous. The hindwings are pale fuscous. Adults are on wing in early June and mid-July, possibly in two generations per year.

The larvae possibly feed on Genista species.

Etymology
The species name refers to the steppe habitat of the species.

References

Moths described in 2010
Syncopacma